Ninety Pound Wuss is the debut studio album by American christian punk group Ninety Pound Wuss, released in 1996 through Tooth And Nail Records. Yuri Ruley, drummer of MxPx, worked as a drum technician on the record. The track "Something Must Break" is considered as the band's most popular song, as it appeared on multiple compilation albums and even has a music video.

Track listing

Personnel

Performers
Jeff Suffering - Vocals, bass
John Himmelburger - Guitar
Marty Martinez - Drums

Production
Ninety Pound Wuss - Music, production
Bob Moon - Production
Aaron Warner - Engineering
Paul Corio - Artwork
Brandon Ebel - Photography, executive producer
Yuri Ruley - Drum technician

References

External links

1996 albums
Ninety Pound Wuss albums